The 1988 Ottawa Rough Riders finished the season in 4th place in the East Division with a 2–16 record and failed to qualify for the post-season. In terms of winning percentage (0.111), this was the worst season the franchise had endured since the formation of the Canadian Football League. Additionally, it was the worst record for a Grey Cup host city team as Ottawa hosted the 76th Grey Cup this year. The Rough Riders, which prior to the start of the season promised their fans good things for the coming year, had dubbed the 1988 season "Super season '88".

Offseason

CFL Draft

Preseason

Regular season

Standings

Schedule

Awards and honours

CFL Awards
CFL's Most Outstanding Rookie Award – Orville Lee (RB)

CFL All-Stars
Rod Brown-replacement player

References

Ottawa Rough Riders seasons
1988 Canadian Football League season by team